Franz Xaver von Wegele (29 October 1823, in Landsberg am Lech – 17 October 1897, in Würzburg) was a German historian, largely known for his studies on the history of Thuringia, Franconia and the University of Würzburg.

Education and career 
He studied history at the universities of Munich and Heidelberg, where his influences were Friedrich Christoph Schlosser, Ludwig Häusser and Georg Gottfried Gervinus. In 1849 he obtained his habilitation at the University of Jena, and two years later became an associate professor of history. In 1857 he relocated to the University of Würzburg as a full professor. In 1863 he was named university rector.

Selected works 
 Dante’s Leben und Werke : kulturgeschichtlich dargest., 1852 – Dante's life and works. Cultural historical depiction.
 Annales Reinhardsbrunnenses, (as editor) 1854 – Annals of Reinhardsbrunn.
 Arnold von Selenhofen, Erzbischof von Mainz (1153–1160), (1855) – Arnold of Selenhofen, Archbishop of Mainz.
 Zur Literatur und Kritik der Fränkischen Necrologien, 1864 – Literature and critique of Franconian necrologies.
 Friedrich der Freidige, Markgraf von Meißen, Landgraf von Thüringen, und die Wettiner seiner Zeit : 1247 - 1325, (1870) – Friedrich the Brave, Margrave of Meissen, Landgrave of Thuringia, and the Wettiner of his time.
 Kaiser Friedrich I., Barbarossa, 1871 – Frederick Barbarossa.
 Graf Otto von Hennenberg-Botenlauben und sein Geschlecht (1180–1250), (1875) – Otto von Botenlauben and his lineage.
 Göthe als Historiker, 1876 – Goethe as an historian.
 Geschichte der Universität Wirzburg (2 parts), 1882 – History of the University of Würzburg. 
 Geschichte der deutschen Historiographie seit dem Auftreten des Humanismus, 1885 – History of German historiography since the advent of Humanism.
Wegele was the author of many articles in the Allgemeine Deutsche Biographie.

References 

1823 births
1897 deaths
Academic staff of the University of Jena
Academic staff of the University of Würzburg
Heidelberg University alumni
Ludwig Maximilian University of Munich alumni
People from Landsberg am Lech
German medievalists